The Third Hughes ministry (Nationalist) was the 13th ministry of the Government of Australia. It was led by the country's 7th Prime Minister, Billy Hughes. The Third Hughes ministry succeeded the Second Hughes ministry, which dissolved on 17 February 1917 after the governing National Labor Party merged with the Liberal Party to form the Nationalist Party. The National Labor Party itself formed as a consequence of the split that took place within the then-governing Labor Party over the issue of conscription. The ministry was replaced by the Fourth Hughes ministry on 8 January 1918 following the resignation of Hughes as Prime Minister after a vote of no-confidence within the Nationalist Party in the wake of a failed second referendum on conscription. However, due to a lack of alternative leaders, Hughes was immediately re-commissioned as Prime Minister by Governor-General Sir Ronald Munro Ferguson.

Billy Hughes, who died in 1952, was the last surviving member of the Third Hughes ministry; Hughes was also the last surviving member of the Watson ministry, First Fisher ministry, Third Fisher ministry and Second Hughes ministry.

Ministry

References

Ministries of George V
Hughes, 3
1917 establishments in Australia
1918 disestablishments in Australia
Cabinets established in 1917
Cabinets disestablished in 1918